John Wicks is a drummer, songwriter, film composer and adjunct college professor based in Missoula, Montana.

Wicks is a founder of the band Fitz and the Tantrums and has co-written many of their songs. More Than Just a Dream, the group's 2013 album, included the hit songs "The Walker" and "Out of My League", which each climbed to No. 1 on Billboard's Alternative Songs chart. Fitz and the Tantrums, the band's self-titled studio album, features the hit song "HandClap".

Wicks has also written for and appeared on Bruno Mars' album Doo-Wops & Hooligans and CeeLo Green's The Lady Killer and Heart Blanche albums. In addition, he has recorded and/or played live with such artists as B.o.B, George Clinton (funk musician), David Byrne, Meshell Ndegeocello, Chocolate Genius, Money Mark, Teddybears (band), RZA, among others.

As of Fall semester 2022, Wicks is an adjunct professor at the University of Montana. He also composed the soundtrack to the TV show Under the Banner of Heaven (TV series) with Pearl Jam bassist Jeff Ament and multi-instrumentalist Josh Klinghoffer. Up until Oct 16, 2022 Wicks continued to tour, compose and record with Fitz and the Tantrums, but has now left the band after 13+ years to focus on family, his job at U. Montana and to “reinvent and upgrade his drumming.” He recently wrote songs and recorded drums for the upcoming Fitz and The Tantrums record entitled “Let Yourself Free” and is finishing a new recording with Jeff Ament of Pearl Jam called Deaf Charlie.

Wicks endorses Gretsch Drums, Remo Drumheads,Vater Drumsticks, and Istanbul Agop cymbals.

Recordings

 Fitz and the Tantrums "Get Yourself Free" (Elektra Records) 2022
 Fitz and the Tantrums "All the Feels" (Elektra Records) 2019
 Fitz and the Tantrums "Fitz and the Tantrums" (Elektra Records) 2016
 Fitz and the Tantrums "More Than Just a Dream" (Elektra Records) 2013
 Bruno Mars Doo-Wops & Hooligans (Elektra Records) 2010 co-wrote and played on "The Other Side"
 Fitz and the Tantrums "Pickin' Up the Pieces" (Dangerbird Records) 2010
 Bruno Mars with Cee Lo & B.o.B It's Better If You Don't Understand EP (Elektra Records) 2010
 Cee Lo Green "Heart Blanche" (Elektra Records) 2015
 Chocolate Genius Swan Songs 2010
 Cee Lo Green "Lady Killer" (Elektra Records) 2010
 Peter Adams Spotlight Floodlight 2010
 Skerik's Syncopated Taint Septet Live at The Triple Door (Royal Potato Family) 2010
 Soundtrack to Holy Rollers First Independent Pictures 2010
 Soundtrack to Adventures of Power 2010
 Heather Porcaro The Heartstring Symphony produced by Tony Berg 2009
 Henry Gummer "Stop the Train" on the soundtrack to Julie & Julia (Columbia Pictures) 2009
 N.A.S.A. (ANTI-/Epitaph/Spectrophonic Sound) 2008 with RZA, David Byrne, Chali 2na and George Clinton
 Donavon Frankenreiter Pass It Around (Wrasse Records) 2008
 Alana Sweetwater 2008
 Jean Mazzei produced by Ronan Chris Murphy
 Whitton produced by Ronan Chris Murphy
 Ashton Zyer produced by David Rosa 2007
 Soundtrack to Beautiful Losers composed by Money Mark 2007
 Jessica Fichot Le Chemin April 2007
 Tina Tohsakul 2007
 Money Mark Brand New by Tomorrow produced by Mario Caldato Jr. (Brushfire/Universal) 2007
 Soccermom 2007
 Donavon Frankenreiter "Lovely Day" on Snakes on a Plane soundtrack (New Line Cinema) 2006
 Iggy Pop with Teddybears "Punk Rocker" Squeak E Clean remix (Atlantic) 2006
 Soundtrack to the surf film The Kill Seven with Soccermom 2006
 Skerik's Syncopated Taint Septet Husky (Hyena) 2006 - #1 on CMJ Jazz Charts
 Swampdweller (Freetone Records) 2005
 Longboard Magazine DVD with Dylan Cooper and Heather Porcaro 2005
 Skip Heller "Fakebook" (Hyena) 2004
 Spirit Tuck 2004
 Skerik's Syncopated Taint Septet (Ropeadope/WEA) 2003
 The Hit Shermer, Illinois (Cydonia) 2003
 Skip Heller The Battle in Seattle (Jewbilee) 2003
 Joe Doria The Place to Be 2003
 Samo Hard G Coach (NCM East) 2001
 Nikol Kollars Cream of the Drop: Seattle Downbeat Hip Hop Compilation (360BPM) 2000
 Bebop and Destruction Heavy Machinery (My Own Planet) 1998
 Dan Heck Trio Go to Work! (Trio) 1998
 Ryan Burns This Is The Ryan Burns Trio (Trio) 1997
 The Marriott Jazz Quintet produced by Delfeayo Marsalis (Red Raspus) 1997
 Robert Strauss "Children" Demo (WEA) 1997
 Bebop and Destruction Day After 1996

Television appearances
 CBS "Late Night with David Letterman with Fitz and the Tantrums
 ABC "Jimmy Kimmel Live!" with Fitz and the Tantrums
 VH1 "The VH1 Critics Choice Awards" with Fitz and the Tantrums
 NBC "Late Night with Jimmy Fallon" with Fitz and the Tantrums
 TBS "Late Night with Conan O'Brien" with Fitz and the Tantrums
 NBC "The Tonight Show with Jay Leno" with Fitz and the Tantrums
 NBC "Last Call with Carson Daly" with Fitz and the Tantrums
 ABC "The Ellen DeGeneres Show" with Fitz and the Tantrums and Joshua Radin
 VH1 with The Greasy Beats at The World Breakdancing Championship 2007
 NBC "Studio 60 on the Sunset Strip" Episode 1 2006
 Sundance Channel with Money Mark Live at South By Southwest 2007.
 MTV Japan with Money Mark Live at Fuji Rock July 2007
 MTV Japan with Money Mark Live at Summer Sonic Aug. 2005
 MTV Brasil with Money Mark Live at Nokia Fest Sept. 2005
 CMT with Minnie Driver May 2005
 NBC "Last Call with Carson Daly" with Minnie Driver June 2005
 TLC "That Yin Yang Thing" 2005

References 
Jazz at the Sunset Tavern, Jason West, AllAboutJazz, August 2001
Syncopated Taint Septet, Nils Jacobson, AllAboutJazz, July 25, 2003

External links 

Living people
American drummers
Musicians from Seattle
Wicks John M.
Fitz and The Tantrums members
Year of birth missing (living people)
Skerik's Syncopated Taint Septet members